Gravel Hill, located in the eastern section of Restigouche County, is a small rural community in New Brunswick, Canada of less than 100 people which is part of the Chaleur Local Service District.

History

Notable people

See also
List of communities in New Brunswick

References

Communities in Restigouche County, New Brunswick